Big Foot Beach State Park is a state park of Wisconsin, United States, on Geneva Lake.  The park is used primarily for hiking, swimming, camping, and fishing.

The beach and park are named for Big Foot (a translation from the Potawatomi Maumksuck  (Mmangzed),  also known in French as Gros Pied), an early Potawatomi leader in the area until his band forcibly relocated by the United States in 1836. Big Foot Lake was the original English name of Geneva Lake.

References

External links

Big Foot Beach State Park Wisconsin Department of Natural Resources

State parks of Wisconsin
Protected areas established in 1949
Protected areas of Walworth County, Wisconsin
1949 establishments in Wisconsin